The Halifax Seaport is a Canadian commercial development located on the Halifax, Nova Scotia waterfront, at the southern end of the Halifax Boardwalk. It is a re-use of former shipping warehouses. The intent of the multi-year project is to create a thriving new arts and culture district in the city.

Notable tenants include NSCAD University, the new Halifax Farmers' Market, a cruise ship terminal, the Canadian Museum of Immigration at Pier 21, and the Cunard Centre, a multi-purpose events venue. The Seaport is managed by the Halifax Port Authority.

See also
 Discovery Centre – a new adjacent museum
 Westin Nova Scotian – an adjacent hotel

External links
 

Redeveloped ports and waterfronts in Canada
Buildings and structures in Halifax, Nova Scotia
Culture of Halifax, Nova Scotia
Tourist attractions in Halifax County, Nova Scotia